The Import and Export functional constituency is a functional constituency in the elections for the Legislative Council of Hong Kong first created in 1995 as one of the nine new functional constituencies under the electoral reform carried out by the then Governor Chris Patten, in which the electorate consisted of total 113,241 eligible voters worked related to the import and export industry. It was abolished with the colonial Legislative Council dissolved after the transfer of the sovereignty in 1997.

The constituency was recreated for the 1998 Legislative Council election unless its electorate base has significantly narrowed from individual voting to some 1,000 electors are only limited to import and export companies who are members of the Hong Kong Chinese Importers' and Exporters' Association or are licensed to import and export dutiable commodities, motor vehicles and chemicals. In 2020, there were a total number of 1,603 electors, 984 corporates and 619 individuals in the constituency. After the major electoral overhaul in 2021, the eligible voters are limited to 231 corporate members of the Hong Kong Chinese Importers’ and Exporters’ Association entitled to vote at general meetings of the Association.

Return members

Electoral results

2020s

2010s

2000s

1990s

References

Constituencies of Hong Kong
Constituencies of Hong Kong Legislative Council
Functional constituencies (Hong Kong)
1995 establishments in Hong Kong
Constituencies established in 1995